Events from the year 1727 in Russia

Events

Births

Deaths

14 June – Cornelius Cruys, Vice Admiral of the Imperial Russian Navy (b. 1655).

Full date missing
 Catherine I, monarch (born 1684)

References

1727 in Russia
Years of the 18th century in the Russian Empire